To the Ivy League from Nat is an album by jazz cornetist Nat Adderley released on the EmArcy label featuring performances by Adderley with his brother Cannonball Adderley, Junior Mance, Sam Jones/Al McKibbon, and Charles "Specs" Wright with arrangements by Ernie Wilkins. The album was later released as part of the Cannonball Adderley compilation Sophisticated Swing: The EmArcy Small Group Sessions in 1995.

Reception
The Allmusic review awarded the album four stars.

Track listing
Compositions by Nat Adderley except as indicated
 "Room 251" [aka Number 251] (Jaki Byard) - 2:45  
 "Sam's Tune" (Sam Jones) - 3:32  
 "Sam's Tune" [alternate take] (Jones) - 3:06 Bonus track on CD  
 "Bimini" - 3:40  
 "The Fat Man" (Jerome Richardson) - 3:30  
 "Sermonette" (Julian "Cannonball" Adderley) - 3:36  
 "Jackleg" (Samuel Hurt) - 3:50  
 "The Nearness of You" (Hoagy Carmichael, Ned Washington) - 6:21  
 "Rattler's Groove" - 3:25  
 "Hayseed" - 3:06  
 "Hoppin' John" (Nat Adderley, Julian "Cannonball" Adderley) - 4:38 Bonus track on CD  
 "Yesterdays" (Jerome Kern, Otto Harbach) - 2:53 Bonus track on CD  
Recorded in New York City on July 12 (tracks 4, 6, 10 & 11), 18 (tracks 1, 7 & 9), & 23 (tracks 2, 3, 5, 8 & 12), 1956

Personnel
Nat Adderley – cornet
Cannonball Adderley - alto saxophone
Junior Mance - piano
Sam Jones - bass (tracks 3-11), cello (tracks 2 & 3)
Al McKibbon - bass (tracks 1-3) 
Charles "Specs" Wright - drums

References

1956 albums
EmArcy Records albums
Nat Adderley albums